Dadhahur is a village in Punjab, India.

The tehsil of this village is Raikot in Ludhiana district.

A canal called Bathinda branch canal, crosses through the village and flows to Bathinda.

A small market and bus stop is located near the canal.

Schools 
There are four schools in the village.

Hospitals 
There are two health centers in the village.

1. Dispensary for mother & child care. ( Govt. Approved )

2. Vaternary Hospital. ( Govt. Approved )

  
Villages in Ludhiana district